The Pueblo clowns (sometimes called sacred clowns) are jesters or tricksters in the Kachina religion (practiced by the Pueblo natives of the southwestern United States).  It is a generic term, as there are a number of these figures in the ritual practice of the Pueblo people. Each has a unique role; belonging to separate Kivas (secret societies or confraternities) and each has a name that differs from one mesa or pueblo to another.

Roles
The clowns perform monthly rituals, summer (for rain), November - for the gods, for curing society, black magic.

In order for a clown to perform meaningful social commentary via humor, the clown's identity must usually be concealed. The sacred clowns of the Pueblo people, however, do not employ masks but rely on body paint and head dresses. These individuals present themselves with  black and white horizontal stripes painted on their bodies and faces, paint black circles around the mouth and eyes, and part their hair in the center and bind it in two bunches which stand upright on each side of the head and are trimmed with corn husks.

Anthropologists, most notably Adolf Bandelier in his 1890 book, The Delight Makers, and Elsie Clews Parsons in her Pueblo Indian Religion, have extensively studied the meaning of the Pueblo clowns and clown society in general.  Bandelier notes that the Tsuku were somewhat feared by the Hopi as the source of public criticism and censure of non-Hopi like behavior. Their function can help defuse community tensions by providing their own humorous interpretation of the tribe's popular culture, by reinforcing taboos, and by communicating traditions. A 1656 case of a young Hopi man impersonating the resident Franciscan priest at Awat'ovi is thought to be a historic instance of Pueblo clowning.

See also
Heyoka

Notes

References
Gutenberg etext of Adolf Bandelier The Delight Makers
P. Farb, Man's Rise to Civilisation, 1971.
M. Conrad Hyers The Spirituality of Comedy: comic heroism in a tragic world 1996 Transaction Publishers 
Elsie Clews Parsons Pueblo Indian Religion, University of Chicago Press, 1939.
Elsie Clews Parsons and Ralph L. Beals, The Sacred Clowns of the Pueblo and Mayo-Yaqui Indians American Anthropologist, New Series, Vol. 36, No. 4 (October–December, 1934), pp. 491–514
Pecina, Ron and Pecina, Bob. Hopi Kachinas: History, Legends, and Art. Schiffer Publishing Ltd. 2013; . Pages 124-138.  
J. H. Steward, The Ceremonial Buffoons of the American Indians, Michigan Academy of Sciences, pp 187–207, 1930.
 Alison Freese, `Send in the Clowns: An Ethnohistorical Analysis of the Sacred Clowns' Role in Cultural Boundary Maintenance Among the Pueblo Indians' (doctoral thesis, University of New Mexico, 1991)

External links
Rainmakers from the Gods: Hopi Katsinam, Peabody Museum online exhibition

Hopi mythology
Ritual clowns